Benson House or Benson Building or variations may refer to:

in the United States (by state then city)
A. S. Benson House, Loveland, Colorado, listed on the National Register of Historic Places (NRHP) in Larimer County, Colorado
Benson Building (Ottumwa, Iowa), NRHP-listed in Wapello County
Benson Building (Baltimore, Maryland), NRHP-listed
Benson-Hammond House, Linthicum Heights, Maryland, NRHP-listed
Dr. Theodore J. Benson House, Fromberg, Montana, NRHP-listed in Carbon County, Montana
John G. Benson House, Englewood, New Jersey, NRHP-listed in Bergen County
Benson House (Wading River, New York), site of a World War II counterintelligence operation, NRHP-listed
Judge Henry L. Benson House, Klamath Falls, Oregon, NRHP-listed
Simon Benson House, Portland, Oregon, NRHP-listed

See also
Bensen House (Grant, Florida), NRHP-listed